House and Land is the first studio album by American duo House and Land. It was released on June 16, 2017 on Thrill Jockey. The album received positive reviews and was named the 25th best album of 2017 by Magnet magazine.

Track listing

References

2017 albums
Thrill Jockey albums